In ring theory, a branch of mathematics, the radical of an ideal  of a commutative ring is another ideal defined by the property that an element  is in the radical if and only if some power of  is in . Taking the radical of an ideal is called radicalization. A radical ideal (or semiprime ideal) is an ideal that is equal to its radical. The radical of a primary ideal is a prime ideal.

This concept is generalized to non-commutative rings in the Semiprime ring article.

Definition

(note that ).
Intuitively,  is obtained by taking all roots of elements of  within the ring . Equivalently,  is the preimage of the ideal of nilpotent elements (the nilradical) of the quotient ring  (via the natural map ).  The latter proves that  is an ideal.

If an ideal  coincides with its own radical, then  is called a radical ideal or semiprime ideal.

Examples
 Consider the ring  of integers.
In fact, this generalizes to an arbitrary ideal (see the Properties section).
 Consider the ideal . It is trivial to show  (using the basic property ), but we give some alternative methods: The radical  corresponds to the nilradical  of the quotient ring , which is the intersection of all prime ideals of the quotient ring. This is contained in the Jacobson radical, which is the intersection of all maximal ideals, which are the kernels of homomorphisms to fields. Any ring homomorphism  must have  in the kernel in order to have a well-defined homomorphism (if we said, for example, that the kernel should be  the composition of  would be  which is the same as trying to force ).

Properties
This section will continue the convention that I is an ideal of a commutative ring :

It is always true that , i.e. radicalization is an idempotent operation. Moreover,  is the smallest radical ideal containing .
 is the intersection of all the prime ideals of  that contain and thus the radical of a prime ideal is equal to itself. Proof: On one hand, every prime ideal is radical, and so this intersection contains . Since  contains , but not , this shows that  is not in the intersection of prime ideals containing . This finishes the proof.
Specializing the last point, the nilradical (the set of all nilpotent elements) is equal to the intersection of all prime ideals of  This property is seen to be equivalent to the former via the natural map  which yields a bijection :  defined by 
An ideal  in a ring  is radical if and only if the quotient ring  is reduced.
The radical of a homogeneous ideal is homogeneous.
The radical of an intersection of ideals is equal to the intersection of their radicals: .
The radical of a primary ideal is prime. If the radical of an ideal  is maximal, then  is primary.
If  is an ideal, . Since prime ideals are radical ideals,  for any prime ideal .
Let  be ideals of a ring . If  are comaximal, then  are comaximal.
Let  be a finitely generated module over a Noetherian ring .

Applications
The primary motivation in studying radicals is Hilbert's Nullstellensatz in commutative algebra. One version of this celebrated theorem states that for any ideal  in the polynomial ring  over an algebraically closed field , one has

where

and

Another way of putting it: the composition  is a closure operator on the set of ideals of a ring.

See also
 Jacobson radical
 Nilradical of a ring
 Real radical

Notes

Citations

References 

 

Ideals (ring theory)
Closure operators